The 28th Annual Screen Actors Guild Awards, honoring the best achievements in film and television performances for the year 2021, was presented on February 27, 2022 at the Barker Hangar in Santa Monica, California. The ceremony was broadcast live on both TNT and TBS 8:00 p.m. EST / 5:00 p.m. PST. The nominees were announced on January 12, 2022 by Rosario Dawson and Vanessa Hudgens via Instagram Live.

For film, the deaf/non-hearing cast members that are a part of the ensemble of CODA made history by becoming the first disabled performers to receive a nomination for Outstanding Performance by a Cast in a Motion Picture in the awards' history. Individually for CODA, Troy Kotsur became the first deaf/non-hearing actor to receive an individual SAG Award nomination. For television, Squid Game made history by becoming the first non-English series and first Korean series to be nominated for Outstanding Performance by an Ensemble in a Drama Series. Individually for Squid Game, Lee Jung-jae became the first male actor from Asia and Korea to receive an individual SAG Award nomination and HoYeon Jung became the second actress of Asian as well as Korean descent to do the same. With their respective portrayals of Aretha Franklin in the film Respect and television miniseries Genius: Aretha, Jennifer Hudson and Cynthia Erivo became the first set of actors to be nominated for playing the same role in the same year. For her performance as Anita in Steven Spielberg's West Side Story, Ariana DeBose became the first Afro-Latina and openly queer woman of color to win the Screen Actors Guild Award for Outstanding Performance by a Female Actor in a Supporting Role.

Helen Mirren was announced as the 2021 SAG Life Achievement Award recipient on November 18, 2021.

Winners and nominees
 Note: Winners are listed first and highlighted in boldface.

Film

Television

Screen Actors Guild Life Achievement Award
 Helen Mirren

In Memoriam
The segment, introduced by Maggie Gyllenhaal, was set to the song "Sailboat" by Cody Fry and Ben Rector, and honored the following who died in 2021 and early 2022:

 Ed Asner
 Charlie Robinson
 Bob Saget
 Jane Powell
 Clarence Williams III
 Felix Silla
 Olympia Dukakis
 Lisa Banes
 Howard Hesseman
 Helen McCrory
 Jean-Paul Belmondo
 Arlene Dahl
 Robert Hogan
 Saginaw Grant
 Suzzanne Douglas
 Markie Post
 Gavin MacLeod
 Al Harrington
 Norman Lloyd
 Richard Gilliland
 Michael K. Williams
 Art LaFleur
 Melvin Van Peebles
 Sonny Chiba
 Paul Mooney
 David Gulpilil
 Jackie Mason
 James Hampton
 Sally Kellerman
 Max Julien
 Richard Lee-Sung
 Peter Scolari
 James Michael Tyler
 Jane Withers
 Willie Garson
 Mimi Cozzens
 Walter Olkewicz
 Charles Grodin
 Meat Loaf
 Yvette Mimieux
 Dwayne Hickman
 Frank McRae
 Michael Nesmith
 Stuart Damon
 Frank Bonner
 William Lucking
 Michael Constantine
 Ned Beatty
 Norm Macdonald
 Gaspard Ulliel
 Louie Anderson
 Peter Bogdanovich
 Dean Stockwell
 Betty White
 Sidney Poitier

References

External links
 

2021
Screen
2021 in American cinema
2021 in American television
Screen
2022 in Los Angeles
2022 awards in the United States
February 2022 events in the United States